Jef Martens, better known by his stage name Basto (stylized as Basto!), is a Belgian record producer, musician and DJ. He primarily produces electro house music, and he is signed to the ARS label. He has produced using various aliases such as Bitch Boys, Candyman, Dirty Bunch, DJ Basik, Felix Project, Jin Sonic, Kings of Porn, and Lazy Jay. He was also a member of the Belgian dance group Lasgo. Martens co-produced with the band in 2009 and 2010 on a number of singles. He is best known for producing the Azealia Banks' hit debut single "212" under the alias of Lazy Jay, together with his brother Toon. He also produced "Scream & Shout" for will.i.am and Britney Spears in 2012.

Musical career
He started DJing in 2005, finding local success in Belgium and the Netherlands through "Rock With You" (2005) and a later cooperation with Peter Luts in "On My Own" (2008). It was with "Gregory's Theme" (2011) that Basto found chart success in France. After some well-received remixes for well-known artists, including Kylie Minogue, Moby and Sander Van Doorn, he gained international fame through a successful dance hit, "Again and Again" in 2011. Basto! dropped the exclamation mark from his name to be known as Basto.

Discography

Studio albums 
 Live Tonight (2013)

Extended plays
2017
 EP 1

2018
 Sunrise / Shut Your Eyes

Singles

As lead artist

As featured artist

Remixes
2010
 AnnaGrace – Love Keeps Calling (Basto Remix)
 Angellisa – Hard to Breathe (Lazy Jay Remix)

2011
 Lasgo – Hold Me Now (Basto Remix)
 Sander Van Doorn featuring Carol Lee – Love Is Darkness (Basto Remix)
 Ian Van Dahl – Just A Girl (Basto Remix)
 Kylie Minogue – Put Your Hands Up (Basto Remix)
 Moby – The Day (Basto Remix)
 Adrian Lux featuring The Good Natured – Alive (Basto Remix)

2012
 Ed Sheeran – Drunk (Lazy Jay's Wasted in London Remix)
 The Wanted – Warzone (Basto Remix)
 Labrinth – Express Yourself (Lazy Jay Remix)
 Chic Flowerz – Gypsy Woman (Basto Remix)
 Starkillers and Nadia Ali – Keep It Coming (Basto Remix)
 Lil Jon featuring LMFAO – Drink (Lazy Jay Remix)
 Flo Rida featuring Sia – Wild Ones (Basto Remix)
 Spandau Ballet vs. Basto – Gold 2012

2013
 Basto vs. Keane – Bend and Break (Basto Remix)

2016
 Cleo – Zabiorę Nas (Basto Remix)

References

1975 births
Living people
Belgian DJs
Belgian electronic musicians
Belgian record producers
Electro house musicians
People from Hoogstraten
Electronic dance music DJs